Diaochan was one of the Four Beauties of ancient China. Although based on a minor historical personage, she is mostly a fictional character. She is best known for her role in the 14th-century historical novel Romance of the Three Kingdoms, which romanticises the events in the late Eastern Han dynasty and the Three Kingdoms period. In the novel, she has a romance with the warrior Lü Bu and causes him to betray and kill his foster father, the tyrannical warlord Dong Zhuo. She was praised in tales as a woman of unrivaled beauty who did what no other hero in China was able to accomplish: put an end to Dong Zhuo's regime of terror and the eventual end of Lǚ Bu; triggering the events that would lead to the formation of the Three Kingdoms: Cao Wei, Eastern Wu and Shu Han.

Development
Chinese historical records indicate that Lü Bu had a secret affair with one of Dong Zhuo's maids and he constantly feared that Dong Zhuo would find out. This was one of the reasons why he betrayed and assassinated Dong Zhuo in May 192. The maid's name was not recorded, however. A later zaju Duoji (now lost) explained the name, which literally means "sable cicada", as derived from the sable tails and jade decorations in the shape of cicadas which adorned the hats of high-ranking officials in the Eastern Han dynasty. 

In earlier stories, Diaochan was described as Lü Bu's wife who had been accidentally separated from Lü Bu during the political disorder, and was unaware of the conspiracy against Dong Zhuo. Later stories removed this background and had her more actively participating in the scheme. Narrations about Diaochan's ultimate fate appeared in Yuan dynasty zaju. The titles of these lost works suggest Diaochan, viewed as a femme fatale, was decapitated by Guan Yu after Lü Bu's death, which was inherited by some of later Ming or Qing operas featuring Diaochan.

In Romance of the Three Kingdoms

In the 14th-century historical novel Romance of the Three Kingdoms, Diaochan assists the official Wang Yun in a plot to persuade Lü Bu to kill his foster father, the tyrannical warlord Dong Zhuo. Wang Yun presents her to Dong Zhuo as a concubine, but also betrothes her to Lü Bu at the same time. Diaochan uses her beauty to turn Dong Zhuo and Lü Bu against each other by inciting jealousy between them.

While Dong Zhuo is out one day, Lü Bu sneaks into his bedroom in the hope of seeing Diaochan. Diaochan pretends to be very upset and attempts suicide by throwing herself into the pond, saying that she is ashamed to see Lü Bu because she had been violated by Dong Zhuo. Lü Bu is heartbroken and promises that he will not let her suffer further at the hands of Dong Zhuo. Just then, Dong Zhuo returns and sees them embracing each other. As Lü Bu flees, Dong Zhuo chases him and hurls a spear at him, but misses. On the way, Dong Zhuo meets his adviser, Li Ru, who suggests to him to let Lü Bu have Diaochan, so as to win Lü Bu's trust. Dong Zhuo goes back to Diaochan later and accuses her of betraying his love, saying that he intends to present her to Lü Bu. Diaochan replies indignantly that Lü Bu embraced her against her will and attempts suicide to "prove her love" for Dong Zhuo. Dong Zhuo is moved and dismisses the idea of relinquishing her.

Lü Bu is outraged and goes to Wang Yun's house to vent his frustration. Wang Yun then uses the opportunity to instigate Lü Bu to join the plot to kill Dong Zhuo. Lü Bu kills Dong Zhuo when the latter shows up at a ceremony for Emperor Xian to abdicate the throne to him; the ceremony is actually a trap set by Wang Yun and Lü Bu. After Dong Zhuo's death, Lü Bu marries Diaochan and flees Chang'an with her when he is defeated by Dong Zhuo's former followers.

In the later novel, Diaochan has only a cameo in the Battle of Xiapi, and is not mentioned again thereafter.

In folk tales
In one folktale, Diaochan is captured by Cao Cao after the Battle of Xiapi. Cao Cao presents her to Guan Yu in the hope of winning Guan Yu's loyalty. Guan Yu, however, suspects that he is being tricked when he recalls how Diaochan had betrayed Lü Bu and Dong Zhuo. He kills her to prevent her from doing further harm. In another tale, Liu Bei, Guan Yu and Zhang Fei all want to marry Diaochan, and they argue bitterly over the issue. Guan Yu kills her to end the dispute.

In the Yuan dynasty play Lianhuan Ji (連環計), Diaochan is said to be the daughter of Ren Ang (任昂), and her real name is Ren Hongchang (任紅昌). She is in charge of taking care of the Sable Cicada Hat (貂蟬冠), so she becomes known as "Diaochan" (literally "sable cicada"). She is introduced to Guan Yu by Zhang Fei after Lü Bu's death. Instead of accepting her as the spoils of war, Guan Yu decapitates her with his sword. This event is not mentioned in historical records or the historical novel Romance of the Three Kingdoms, but is propagated through mass media such as operas and storytelling.

Diaochan's eventual fate differs in various accounts: some said that she is killed by Dong Zhuo's followers, along with Wang Yun, after Lü Bu escapes; others claim that she follows Lü Bu while he roams around with his forces. In some adaptations of the novel, Diaochan is executed along with Lü Bu after Lü Bu's defeat at the Battle of Xiapi or killed herself with the seven star dagger after Cao Cao took a liking to her.

In popular culture

Diaochan appears a playable character in Koei's Dynasty Warriors Aura Kingdom  and Warriors Orochi video game series. She also appears in the manga series Souten Kouro. In the card game Magic: The Gathering, there is a Legendary Creature card called "Diaochan, Artful Beauty". Similarly, Diaochan appears as an alternate skin for the rogue class in the card game Hearthstone, titled Diao Chan Valeera. She also appears as a character in Total War: Three Kingdoms. Diaochan is a playable character in the Mobile/PC Game Rise of Kingdoms.

Notable actresses who have portrayed Diaochan in films and television series include: Violet Koo in Diao Chan (1938); Lin Dai in Diao Chan (1958); Nina Li in The Beauty Diu Sim (1987); Chen Hong in Romance of the Three Kingdoms (1994); Irene Chiu in Guan Gong (1996); Chen Hao in Three Kingdoms (2010); Gulnazar in God of War, Zhao Yun (2016) and Dynasty Warriors (2019).

See also
 Lists of people of the Three Kingdoms
 List of fictional people of the Three Kingdoms

References

Sources
 Chen, Shou (3rd century). Records of the Three Kingdoms (Sanguozhi).
 Fan, Ye (5th century). Book of the Later Han (Houhanshu).
 
 
 Luo, Guanzhong (14th century). Romance of the Three Kingdoms (Sanguo Yanyi).
 

Fictional Han dynasty people
Chinese concubines